A list of animated feature films that were released in 2017.

{| class="sortable wikitable" 
|+ Animated feature films first released in 2017
|-
! scope="col" | Title
! scope="col" | Country
! scope="col" | Director
! scope="col" | Studio
! scope="col" | Animation technique
! scope="col" | Notes
! scope="col" | Type
! scope="col" | Release date 
! scope="col" | Duration
|-
| Alpha and Omega: Journey to Bear Kingdom || United States || Richard Rich || LionsgateCrest Animation Productions || CG Animation || || || May 9, 2017 || 44 minutes
|-
| Ana and Bruno  Ana y Bruno || Mexico || Carlos Carrera || Lo Coloco FilmsAnima Estudios || CG animation || || || June 12, 2017 August 31, 2018 || 96 minutes
|-
| Ancien and the Magic TabletHirune Hime: Shiranai Watashi no Monogatari || Japan || Kenji Kamiyama || Signal.MD || Traditional || || || March 18, 2017 March 18, 2017 August 16, 2017 June 1, 2017 July 28, 2017 August 18, 2017  || 111 minutes
|-
| Anchors UpElias og Storegaps Hemmelighet || Norway || Simen AlsvikKarsten Fullu || AnimandoSteamheads Studios || CG animation || || || October 6, 2017 || 75 minutes
|-
| The Angel in the ClockEl ángel en el reloj || Mexico ||  Miguel Ángel Uriegas ||  Fotosintesis Media || Traditional || || || October 22, 2017 May 25, 2018  || 91 minutes80 minutes 
|-
| Animal Crackers || United StatesSpain || Scott Christian SavaDean LoreyTony Bancroft || Blue Dream StudiosChina Film Group Corporation|| CG animation || || || June 12, 2017 July 21, 2018 July 24, 2020  || 105 minutes
|-
| Baba Yaga. Inception Баба Яга. Начало || Russia || Vladimir Sakov || Art Pictures StudioGlukoza Production  Films based on Baba Yaga || Traditional || || || November 8, 2018 || 63 minutes
|- 
| Backkom Bear: Agent 008 || China || Li Qingfang || Alpha PicturesHarbin Pinge MediaPinngoRG Animation Studios || CG animation || || || January 13, 2017 May 3, 2017  || 86 minutes
|-
| Barbaricina History || Russia || Yuriy Mamontov || Slyers Animation Studios || CG animation || || || April 13, 2017 || 60 minutes
|-
| Batman and Harley Quinn || United States || Sam Liu ||Warner Bros. AnimationDC Entertainment|| Traditional || || || July 21, 2017 August 14, 2017 || 74 minutes
|-
|Batman vs. Two-Face || United States || Rick Morales || Warner Bros. AnimationDC Entertainment || Traditional || || || October 8, 2017 October 10, 2017 || 72 minutes
|-
| Beasts of Burden || ChinaNew Zealand || Kirby Atkins || China Film AnimationHuhu Studios || CG animation || 
|-
| The Big Bad Fox and Other Tales...Le Grand Méchant Renard et autres contes ...|| France || Benjamin RennerPatrick Imbert || FolivariPanique! Production || TraditionalFlash animation || || || June 15, 2017 June 21, 2017  || 83 minutes
|-
| Birds Like UsPtice kao mi|| Bosnia and HerzegovinaTurkeyUnited States || Faruk ŠabanovićAmela Ćuhara || PrimeTimeTurkish Radio || CG animation || || || May 5, 2017 August 16, 2017 November 30, 2017 October 16, 2018 January 25, 2022  || 84 minutes
|-
| Barbie: Video Game Hero || United States || Conrad Helten & Zeke Norton || Universal StudiosArc ProductionsRainmaker Studios || CG animation || || || January 31, 2017 March 26, 2017  || 72 minutes
|-
| Barbie: Dolphin Magic || United States || Conrad Helten || Universal Pictures|Universal StudiosArc ProductionsRainmaker Studios || CG animation || || || September 18, 2017 (Netflix) || 61 minutes
|-
| Black Butler: Book of the Atlantic || Japan || Noriyuki Abe || A-1 Pictures || Traditional || || || January 21, 2017 || 100 minutes
|-
| Blame! || Japan || Hiroyuki Seshita  || Polygon Pictures || CG animation || || || May 20, 2017 || 106 minutes
|-
| Bob the Builder: Mega Machines || United States || Chris ParkerJames Mason || HIT Entertainment || CG animation || || || May 27, 2017 || 63 minutes
|-
| Boonie Bears: Entangled Worlds || China || Ding Liang || Le vision pictures || CG animation || || || 28 January 2017 || 89 minutes
|-
| The Boss Baby || United States || Tom McGrath || DreamWorks Animation || CG animation || || || March 12, 2017 March 31, 2017  || 97 minutes
|-
| The Breadwinner || IrelandCanada || Nora Twomey || Cartoon SaloonAircraft Pictures || Traditional || || || September 8, 2017 November 17, 2017  || 94 minutes
|-
| Bunyan and Babe || United States || Tony Bancroft || Exodus Film Group || CG animation || || || January 12, 2017 || 84 minutes
|-
| Captain Underpants: The First Epic Movie || United States || David Soren || DreamWorks Animation || CG animation || || || May 21, 2017 June 2, 2017  || 88 minutes
|-
| CarGo || United States || James Cullen Bressack || The Asylum || CG animation || || || June 6, 2017 || 96 minutes
|-
| Cars 3 || United States || Brian Fee || Pixar || CG animation || || || May 23, 2017 June 16, 2017  || 102 minutes
|-
| Chain Chronicle Light of Haecceitas: Part 2 || Japan || Masashi Kudō || Telecom Animation FilmGraphinica || Traditional || || || January 14, 2017 || 89 minutes
|-
| Chain Chronicle Light of Haecceitas: Part 3 || Japan || Masashi Kudō || Telecom Animation FilmGraphinica || Traditional || || || February 11, 2017 || 93 minutes
|-
| Cinderella the CatGatta Cenerentola || Italy || Alessandro RakIvan CappielloMarino GuarnieriDario Sansone || Mad Entertainment || CG animation || || || September 14, 2017 || 86 minutes
|-
| Coco || United States || Lee Unkrich || Pixar || CG animation || || || October 20, 2017 November 22, 2017  || 105 minutes
|-
| Code Geass Lelouch of the Rebellion: Awakening Path || Japan || Gorō Taniguchi || Sunrise || Traditional ||  || || October 21, 2017 || 135 minutes
|-
| Condorito: la película || ChilePeru || Alex OrrelleEduardo Schuldt || Aronnax Animation StudiosPajarraco Films, LCC || CG animation || || || October 12, 2017 January 12, 2018  || 88 minutes
|-
| Crayon Shin-chan: Invasion!! Alien Shiriri || Japan || Masakazu Hashimoto || Toho || Traditional || || || April 17, 2017 || 103 minutes
|- 
| Da Hu Fa || China || Zhigang Yang (Busifan) ||  Beijing Enlight Media Co.Horgos Coloroom PicturesTianjin Niceboat Culture Communication || Traditional || || || July 13, 2017 || 95 minutes
|-
| Detective Conan: Crimson Love Letter || Japan || Kobun Shizuno || Toho || Traditional || || || April 15, 2017 || 112 minutes
|-
| Deep || SpainUnited States || Julio Soto Gurpide || The ThinklabGrid AnimationKraken Films || CG animation || || || August 25, 2017 || 92 minutes
|-
| Despicable Me 3 || United States || Pierre CoffinKyle Balda 
|| Illumination Entertainment || CG animation || || || June 14, 2017 June 30, 2017  || 90 minutes
|-
|DC Super Hero Girls: Intergalactic Games || United States || Cecilia Aranovich || Warner Bros. AnimationDC Entertainment || Traditional ||  || || May 9, 2017 May 23, 2017  || 77 minutes
|-
| Digimon Adventure tri. Loss || Japan || Keitaro Motonaga || Toei Animation || Traditional || || || February 25, 2017 || 78 minutes 
|-
| Digimon Adventure tri. Symbiosis || Japan || Keitaro Motonaga || Toei Animation || Traditional || || || September 30, 2017 || 85 minutes 
|-
| Doraemon the Movie 2017: Great Adventure in the Antarctic Kachi Kochi || Japan || Atsushi Takahashi || Toho || Traditional || || || March 4, 2017 || 101 Minutes
|-
| Doru || Turkey || Can Soysal ||  Anibera Animation Studios || CG animation || || || July 7, 2017 || 91 minutes
|-
| Eureka Seven: Hi-Evolution 1 || Japan || Tomoki Kyoda || Bones || Traditional || || || September 16, 2017  || 92 minutes
|-
| The Elephant King || IranLebanon || Hadi Mohammadian || Honarpooya Group || CG animation || || || May 1, 2017 || 80 minutes
|-
| The Emoji Movie || United States || Tony Leondis || Sony Pictures Animation || CG animation || || || July 23, 2017 July 28, 2017  || 86 minutes
|-
| Fairy Tail: Dragon Cry || Japan || Tatsuma Minamikawa || A-1 Pictures || Traditional || || || May 6, 2017 || 85 minutes
|-
| Fantastic Journey to OZ Урфин Джюс и его деревянные солдаты || Russia || Vladimir Toropchin || Melnitsa Animation Studio || CG animation || || || April 20, 2017 || 75 minutes
|-
| Fate/stay night: Heaven's Feel I. Presage Flower || Japan || Tomonori Sudou || Ufotable || Traditional || || || October 14, 2017 || 120 minutes
|-
| Ferdinand || United States || Carlos Saldanha || 20th Century Fox20th Century Fox AnimationBlue Sky Studios || CG animation || || || December 10, 2017 December 15, 2017  || 108 minutes
|-
| Fireworks  Uchiage hanabi, shita kara miru ka? Yoko kara miru ka? || Japan || Akiyuki ShinboNobuyuki Takeuchi || Shaft ||  Traditional || || || August 18, 2017 || 90 minutes
|-
| The Fixies: Top Secret Фиксики: Большой секрет || Russia || Vasiko BedoshviliAndrey Kolpin || Petersburg Animation StudioAeroplane Productions || CG animation || || || October 28, 2017 || 80 minutes
|-
| Free! Timeless Medley || Japan || Eisaku Kawanami || Kyoto AnimationAnimation Do || Traditional || || || April 22, 2017 || 95 minutes
|-
| Free! Timeless Medley: Part 2 || Japan || Eisaku Kawanami || Kyoto AnimationAnimation Do || Traditional || || || July 1, 2017 || 98 minutes
|-
| Free! -Take Your Marks!- || Japan || Eisaku Kawanami || Kyoto AnimationAnimation Do || Traditional || || || October 28, 2017 || 100 minutes
|-
| Genocidal Organ || Japan || Shukō Murase || ManglobeGeno Studio || Traditional || || || February 3, 2017 || 115 minutes
|-
| Gekijōban Haikara-san ga Tōru Zenpen – Benio, Hana no 17-sai || Japan || Kazuhiro Furuhashi || Nippon Animation || Traditional || || || November 11, 2017 || 97 minutes
|-
| GG Bond: Guarding || China || Lu JinmingZhong Yu || Le vision pictures || CG animation || || || January 7, 2017 || 91 minutes
|-
| Girls und Panzer das Finale: Part 1 || Japan || Tsutomu Mizushima || Actas || Traditional ||  || || December 9, 2017 || 47 minutes
|-
| Gnome Alone || United StatesCanada || Peter Lepeniotis || 3QU MediaCinesiteVanguard Animation || CG animation || || || November 2, 2017  || 85 minutes
|-
| Godzilla: Planet of the Monsters || Japan || Kobun ShizunoHiroyuki Seshita || Polygon Pictures || Traditional || || || November 17, 2017 || 88 minutes
|-
| Gordon & PaddyGordon och Paddy|| Sweden || Linda Hambäck ||  Film i VästLee Film || Traditional|| || || December 22, 2017 February 12, 2018  || 62 minutes
|-
| Hanuman Da' Damdaar || India || Ruchi Narain || R.A.T FilmsPercept Picture Company || Traditional || || || June 2, 2017 || 105 minutes
|-
| Harvie and the Magic Museum Гурвинек: Волшебная игра Hurvínek a kouzelné muzeum || RussiaCzech RepublicBelgium || Martin KotíkInna Evlannikova || KinoAtisRolling PicturesGrid Animation || CG animation ||  || || August 31, 2017 || 86 minutes
|- 
| Have a Nice DayHao ji le || China || Liu Jian || Flagship Entertainment GroupLe-Joy Animation Studio|| Traditional || || || February 17, 2017  || 75 minutes
|-
| Hey Arnold!: The Jungle Movie || United States ||Raymie MuzquizStu Livington || Snee-Oosh, Inc.Nickelodeon Animation Studio || Traditional || || || November 24, 2017 || 81 minutes
|-
| Howard Lovecraft and the Undersea Kingdom|| Canada || Sean Patrick O'Reilly || Arcana Studio || CG animation ||  || || October 1, 2017 || 89 minutes
|-
| I'll Just Live in Bando(Ban-do-e Sal-eo-li-lat-da) || South Korea || Lee Young-sun || AniSEED || Traditional || || || June 12, 2017 July 16, 2017  || 85 minutes
|-
| The Incredible Story of the Giant PearDen utrolige historie om den kæmpestore pære || Denmark || Philip Einstein LipskiJørgen LerdamAmalie Næsby Fick || Level K || CG animation || || || October 12, 2017 || 78 minutes
|-
| The Jetsons & WWE: Robo-WrestleMania! || United States || Anthony Bell || Warner Bros. AnimationHanna-BarberaWWE Studios|| Traditional || || || February 28, 2017 March 14, 2017  || 82 minutes
|-
| The Jungle BunchLes As de la jungle || France || David Alaux || TAT ProductionsSND Groupe M6 || CG animation || || || June 13, 2017 July 26, 2017  || 90 minutes
|-
|Journey Beyond Sodor || United Kingdom || David Stoten || HiT EntertainmentMattel Creations || CG animation || || || June 23, 2017 August 22, 2017 October 16, 2017  || 73 minutes
|-
|Justice League Dark || United States || Jay Oliva || Warner Bros. AnimationDC Entertainment || Traditional || || || January 24, 2017 February 7, 2017  || 75 minutes
|-
| Kabaneri of the Iron Fortress film || Japan || Tetsurō Araki || Wit Studio || Traditional || || || January 7, 2017  || 104 minutes (part 2)
|-
| Kikoriki. Legend of the Golden Dragon Смешарики. Легенда о золотом драконе || Russia || Denis Chernov || Petersburg Animation Studio || CG animation || || || March 17, 2017 || 79 minutes
|-
| Kizumonogatari III: Reiketsu-hen || Japan || Akiyuki ShinboTatsuya Oishi || Shaft || Traditional || || || January 6, 2017 || 83 minutes
|-
| The Kuflis :hu:Egy kupac kufli   || Hungary || Kristóf JurikSzabolcs PálfiGéza M. Tóth||KEDD Animation Studio || 2D animation || || || August 17, 2017 || 71 minutes
|-
| Kuroko's Basketball The Movie: Last Game || Japan || Shunsuke Tada || Production I.G || Traditional || || || March 18, 2017 || 90 minutes
|-
| The Legend of King Solomon  :hu:Salamon király kalandjai || HungaryIsrael || Albert Hanan Kaminski || Cinemon EntertainmentEden Productions || Traditional || || || September 28, 2017 || 80 minutes
|-
| The Lego Batman Movie || United States || Chris McKay ||Warner Animation GroupDC EntertainmentThe Lego Group || CG animation || || || January 29, 2017 February 9, 2017 February 10, 2017 March 30, 2017  || 104 minutes
|-
| The Lego Ninjago Movie || United States ||Charlie Bean ||Warner Animation GroupThe Lego Group || CG animation || || || September 16, 2017 September 21, 2017  United States  || 101 minutes
|-
| Lego Scooby-Doo! Blowout Beach Bash || United States || Ethan Spaulding || Warner Bros Animation  Hanna Barbera  The Lego Group || CG animation || || Direct-to-video || July 11, 2017 (digital) July 25, 2017 (DVD and Blu-ray) || 78 minutes
|-
| Lila's BookEl libro de Lila || Colombia || Marcela Rincon || Fosfenos MediaPalero Estudio || TraditionalFlash animation || || || September 21, 2017 September 28, 2017  || 76 minutes
|-
| Lino: An Adventure of Nine Lives:br:Lino: Uma Aventura de Sete Vidas || Brazil || Rafael Ribas || Start Desenhos Animados || CG animation || || || September 7, 2017 || 94 minutes
|-
| Little Heroes  Pequeños héroes || Venezuela || Juan Pablo Buscarini ||  Orinoco FilmsFundación Villa del Cine || CG animation || || || May 6, 2017 June 12, 2017  || 76 minutes
|-
| The Little Vampire 3DDer kleine Vampir || Germany || Richard ClausKarsten Kiilerich || Ambient Entertainment || CG animation || || || October 5, 2017 || 82 minutes
|-
| Loving Vincent || PolandUnited Kingdom || Dorota KobielaHugh Welchman || Trademark FilmsBreakthru Films || Oil-painted / Traditional || || || June 12, 2017 September 22, 2017 October 6, 2017 October 13, 2017  || 95 minutes
|-
| Lu Over the Wall  Yoake Tsugeru Lu no Uta || Japan || Masaaki Yuasa || Science SARU || TraditionalFlash animation || || || May 19, 2017 || 112 minutes
|-
| Lupin the Third: Goemon Ishikawa's Spray of Blood || Japan || Takeshi Koike || Telecom Animation Film || Traditional || || || February 4, 2017 || 54 minutes
|-
| Magical Girl Lyrical Nanoha Reflection || Japan || Takayuki Hamana || Seven Arcs || Traditional || || || July 22, 2017 || 111 minutes
|-
| Mary and the Witch's Flower  Meari to Majo no Hana|| Japan || Hiromasa Yonebayashi || Studio Ponoc || Traditional || || || July 8, 2017 || 103 minutes
|-
| Mazinger Z: Infinity || Japan || Junji Shimizu || Toei Animation || Traditional || || || October 27, 2017 || 95 minutes
|-
| Mission Kathmandu: The Adventures of Nelly & Simon  Nelly et Simon: Mission Yéti || Canada ||  Pierre GrecoNancy Florence Savard || Productions 10e AveSeville Films || CG Animation ||  || || October 5, 2017 February 23, 2018  || 85 minutes
|- 
| Monster Family || GermanyUnited Kingdom || Holger Tappe || Ambient EntertainmentUnited Entertainment || CG animation || || || August 24, 2017 March 2, 2018  || 96 minutes
|-
| Monster IslandIsla Calaca|| Mexico || Leopoldo Aguilar || Anima Estudios || CG animation || || || September 14, 2017 February 20, 2021  || 80 minutes
|-
| Moomins and the Winter Wonderland  Muumien taikatalvi || FinlandPoland ||Ira CarpelanJakub Wronski|| Filmcompaniet || Traditional || || || December 1, 2017 || 82 minutes
|-
|Mariah Carey's All I Want for Christmas Is You || United States || Guy Vasilovich || Universal 1440 EntertainmentSplash EntertainmentMagic Carpet ProductionsUniversal Animation Studios || CG animation || || || November 13, 2017 || 91 minutes
|-
|  || FranceJapan || Guillaume RenardShōjirō Nishimi || Ankama AnimationsStudio 4°C || Traditional || || || June 13, 2017 May 23, 2018 October 12, 2018  || 93 minutes
|-
| My Little Pony: The Movie || United StatesCanada || Jayson Thiessen || Allspark PicturesDHX Media || TraditionalFlash animation || || || September 24, 2017 October 6, 2017  || 99 minutes
|-
| Next Door Spy Nabospionen || Denmark || Karla von Bengtson || Copenhagen BombayTriCoast Entertainment || Flash animation || || || August 10, 2017 || 77 minutes
|-
| The Night Is Short, Walk on Girl  Yoru wa Mijikashi Aruke yo Otome || Japan || Masaaki Yuasa || Science SARU || TraditionalFlash animation || || ||  April 7, 2017 || 93 minutes
|-
| The Nut Job 2: Nutty by Nature || United StatesCanadaSouth Korea || Cal Brunker || ToonBox EntertainmentRedrover Co., Ltd.Gulfstream Pictures || CG animation || || || August 11, 2017 || 91 minutes
|-
| Nur and the Dragon Temple  Nur y el templo del dragón || Spain || Juan Bautista Berasategi || Lotura Films || Flash || || || June 2, 2017 || 64 minutes
|-
| On Happiness Road  Xing Fu Lu Shang || Taiwan || Hsin Yin Sung || Happiness Road Productions || Traditional || || || October 15, 2017 January 5, 2018  || 110 minutes
|-
| Overlord: The Dark Warrior || Japan || Naoyuki Itō || Madhouse || Traditional || || || February 25, 2017  || 117 minutes (Part 1)
|-
| Overlord: The Undead King || Japan || Naoyuki Itō || Madhouse || Traditional || || || March 11, 2017  || 108 minutes (Part 2)
|-
| The Ox || Greece || Giorgos Nikopoulos || Baubo Productions || Traditional || || || November 9, 2017  || 67 minutes
|-
| Peppa Pig: My First Cinema Experience || United Kingdom || Mark BakerIwan Watson || Astley Baker Davies LtdEntertainment One || Flash animation || || || April 7, 2017 || 72 minutes
|-
| Pipi, Pupu & Rosemary: the Mystery of the Stolen NotesPipì Pupù e Rosmarina in Il Mistero delle Note Rapite|| Italy || Enzo D'Alò || Bolero Film || Flash animation || || || November 16, 2017 || 81 minutes	
|-
| Pokémon the Movie: I Choose You! || Japan || Kunihiko Yuyama || OLM || Traditional || || || July 6, 2017 July 15, 2017  || 97 minutes
|-
| Pretty Cure Dream Stars! || Japan || Hiroshi Miyamoto || Toei Animation || Traditional || || || March 18, 2017 || 71 minutes
|-
| Rabbit School: Guardians of the Golden EggDie Häschenscule – Jagd nach dem Goldenen Ei  || Germany || Ute von Münchow-Pohl || Akkord Film Produktion GmbH || CG animation || || || March 16, 2017 || 76 minutes
|-
| Release From Heaven|| Iran || Ali Noori-Oskouei ||  Eshragh Animation, Stunning Media || Traditional || || || February 1, 2017 September 22, 2017  || 76 minutes
|-
| Resident Evil: Vendetta || Japan || Takanori Tsujimoto || Sony Pictures Entertainment JapanMarza Animation Planet || CG animation || || || May 27, 2017 || 97 minutes
|-
| Richard the StorkA Stork's Journey|| GermanyLuxembourgNorwayBelgium || Toby Genkel Reza Memari || Knudsen & Streuber MedienmanufakturUlysses FilmproduktionMelusine ProductionsDen Siste SkillingWalking The Dog || CG animation || || || February 12, 2017 May 5, 2017 June 30, 2017 May 11, 2017  February 7, 2018  || 85 minutes
|-
| Sahara || FranceCanada || Pierre Coré || La Station AnimationMandarin ProductionTransfilm International || CG animation || || || January 18, 2017 May 12, 2017  || 84 minutes
|-
| The Shower (So-na-gi) || South Korea || Jae-hoon Ahn || Meditation With a PencilEBS || Traditional ||  || || August 31, 2017 || 48 minutes
|-
| Si Juki the Movie || Indonesia || Faza Meonk || Falcon Pictures || Traditional || || || December 28, 2017 || 110 minutes
|-
| Shimajiro and the Rainbow Oasis || Japan || Isamu Hirabayashi || Benesse The Answer Studio Co., Ltd. || Traditional Live Action || || || March 10, 2017 || 71 minutes
|-
| Smurfs: The Lost Village || United States || Kelly Asbury || Sony Pictures Animation || CG animation || || || April 5, 2017 April 7, 2017  || 90 minutes
|-
| The Son of Bigfoot  Bigfoot Junior || BelgiumFrance || Jeremy DegrusonBen Stassen || NWave Pictures || CG animation || || || August 16, 2017 February 16, 2018  || 92 minutes
|-
| Sound! Euphonium: Todoketai Melody! || Japan || Tatsuya Ishihara || Kyoto Animation || Traditional || || || September 30, 2017 || 115 minutes
|-
| Space Battleship Yamato 2202: Warriors of Love || Japan || Nobuyoshi Habara || Xebec || Traditional || || || February 25, 2017 || 
|-
|Scooby-Doo! Shaggy's Showdown || United States || Matt Peters || Warner Bros. AnimationHanna-Barbera || Traditional ||  || || January 31, 2017 || 80 minutes
|-
| The Star || United States || Timothy Reckart || Sony Pictures Animation || CG animation || || || November 12, 2017 November 17, 2017  || 86 minutes
|-
| Surf's Up 2: WaveMania || United States || Henry Yu || Sony Pictures Animation || CG Animation || || || January 17, 2017 || 84 minutes
|-
| The Swan Princess: Royally Undercover || United States || Richard Rich || Nest Family EntertainmentStreetLight Animation Productions || CG Animation || || || March 28, 2017 || 79 minutes
|-
|Thomas & Friends: Journey Beyond Sodor || United Kingdom || David Stoten || Hit Entertainment || CG Animation || || || June 23, 2017 August 22, 2017 October 16, 2017  || 73 minutes
|-
| Sword Art Online The Movie: Ordinal Scale || Japan || Tomohiko Ito || A-1 Pictures || Traditional || || || February 18, 2017 || 120 minutes
|-
| Tad the Lost Explorer and the Secret of King Midas Tadeo Jones 2: El secreto del Rey Midas || Spain || Enrique Gato David Alonso || Lightbox EntertainmentTelecinco CinemaTelefónica Studios || CG animation || || || June 13, 2017  || 85 minutes
|-
| The Tale of Peter and Fevronia Сказ о Петре и Февронии || Russia || Yuri Kulakov || Vverh Animation Studio || Traditional || || || 2017 || 85 minutes
|-
| Tales from the Lakeside:hu:Lengemesék || Hungary ||Zsolt Pálfi|| Cinemon Entertainment || Traditional || || || April 27, 2017 || 65 minutes
|-
| Tall TalesDrôles de petites bêtes || France || Antoon KringsArnaud Bouron || Onyx Films || CG animation || || || June 13, 2017 December 13, 2017  || 80 minutes
|-
| Tea Pets || China || Gary Wang || Light Chaser Animation Studios || CG animation || || || May 20, 2017 July 21, 2017  || 98 minutes86 minutes 
|-
| Teen Titans: The Judas Contract || United States || Sam Liu ||Warner Bros. AnimationDC Entertainment|| Traditional || || || March 31, 2017 April 4, 2017  || 84 minutes
|-
| Tehran Taboo || AustriaGermany || Ali Soozandeh ||  Little Dream EntertainmentCoop99 FilmproduktionÖsterreichischer Rundfunk || Traditional || || || May 20, 2017 November 16, 2017  || 96 minutes
|-
| T-Guardians || ChinaSouth Korea || Yan HuangYu Shen || || CG animation || || || August 4, 2017 || 89 minutes
|-
| Three Heroes and the King of the Sea Три богатыря и морской царь || Russia || Konstantin Feoktistov || Melnitsa Animation Studio || Traditional || || || January 1, 2017 || 75 minutes
|-
| Three Heroes and the Princess of Egypt  Три богатыря и принцесса Египта || Russia || Konstantin Feoktistov || Melnitsa Animation Studio || Traditional || || || December 28, 2017 || 75 minutes
|-
| Tofu || China || Joey Zou || Kingkey Animation Studios || CG animation || || || July 28, 2017 || 81 minutes
|-
| Tom and Jerry: Willy Wonka and the Chocolate Factory || United States || Spike Brandt || Warner Bros. Animation || Traditional || || || June 27, 2017 July 11, 2017  || 79 minutes
|-
| Trinity Seven the Movie: The Eternal Library and the Alchemist Girl || Japan || Hiroshi Nishikiori || Seven Arcs Pictures || Traditional || || || February 25, 2017 || 55 minutes
|-
| Virus Tropical || ColombiaEcuador || Santiago Caicedo || Ikki Films || Flash animation || || || October 21, 2017 May 17, 2018  || 97 minutes
|-
| Wall || Canada || Cam Christiansen || National Film Board of Canada || Traditional / CG animation || || || September 25, 2017  || 82 minutes
|-
| Where It Floods || United States || Joel Benjamin || Electricbeard Productions || CG animation || || || May 2, 2017  || 47 minutes
|-
| Zombillenium || France || Arthur de PinsAlexis Ducord || Maybe Movies || CG animation || || || May 24, 2017  || 78 minutes
|-
|}

Highest-grossing animated films
The following is a list of the 10 highest-grossing animated feature films first released in 2017.Despicable Me 3 became the second non-Disney film and the sixth animated film after Toy Story 3 (2010), Frozen (2013), Minions (2015), Zootopia and Finding Dory (both in 2016) to gross over $1 billion, and is currently the seventh-highest-grossing animated film of all time and the 36th-highest-grossing film of all time. The Despicable Me franchise became the highest-grossing animated franchise of all time, passing the Shrek franchise and the 15th-highest-grossing film series ever. It also has the highest theater count ever for any film (animated or live-action) with 4,536 breaking the record from The Twilight Saga: Eclipse'' (2010).

References

2017
2017-related lists